Nawab Ali Mohammad Khan belonged to the Chopan Zai clan of the Khogyani tribe. He was given the title of Nawab by Ahmad Shah Durrani because he helped Multan become the part of Durrani Empire. He was appointed as the governor of Multan for his services. He built the famous Mosque Ali Mohammad khan in Chowk bazaar, constructed the Ali Mohammad Canal, and developed agriculture in the province.

References

People from Multan
People of the Durrani Empire
Pashtun people